Buy Nothing Day is a minor event of protest against consumerism. In North America, the United Kingdom, Finland and Sweden, Buy Nothing Day is held the day after U.S. Thanksgiving, concurrent to Black Friday; elsewhere, it is held the following day, which is the last Saturday in November. Buy Nothing Day was founded in Vancouver by artist Ted Dave and subsequently promoted by Adbusters based in Canada.

The first Buy Nothing Day was organized in Canada in September 1992 "as a day for society to examine the issue of overconsumption." In 1997, it was moved to the Friday after American Thanksgiving, also called "Black Friday", which is one of the ten busiest shopping days in the United States. In 2000, some advertisements by Adbusters promoting Buy Nothing Day were denied advertising time by almost all major television networks except for CNN. Soon, campaigns started appearing in the United States, the United Kingdom, Israel, Austria, Germany, New Zealand, Japan, the Netherlands, France, Norway, Finland.

Activities

Various gatherings and forms of protest have been used on Buy Nothing Day to draw attention to overconsumption:
 Free, non-commercial street parties
 Sit-in
 Buy Nothing Day hike: Rather than celebrating consumerism by shopping, participants celebrate the Earth and nature.
 Buy Nothing Coat Exchange: Coats are collected throughout the month of November from anyone who wants to donate and brought to various locations within each state. On the day after Thanksgiving, many opt out of shopping on Black Friday to donate or volunteer. Anyone who needs a winter coat is welcome to exchange one or just take one. Originating in Providence, Rhode Island, similar winter coat exchanges take place on Buy Nothing Day in Kentucky, Utah, and Oregon.

Buy Nothing Christmas 
Buy Nothing Christmas started unofficially in 1968, when Ellie Clark and her family decided to publicly disregard the commercial aspects of the Christmas holiday. Contemporarily, a movement was created to extend Adbusters' Buy Nothing Day into the entire Christmas season. Buy Nothing Christmas first became official in 2001 when a small group of Canadian Mennonites created a website and gave the movement a name. Adbusters in 2011 renamed the event Occupy Xmas, a reference to the Occupy movement.

Buy Nothing Day was first joined with Adbusters' Buy Nothing Christmas campaign. Shortly after, Lauren Bercovitch, the production manager at Adbusters Media Foundation, publicly embraced the principles of Occupy Xmas, advocating "something as simple as buying locally—going out and putting money into your local economy—or making your Christmas presents". Previously, the central message of Occupy Xmas and Occupy Christmas differed in that Occupy Xmas called for a "Buy Nothing Christmas" and Occupy Christmas called for support of local economy, artists, and craftspeople in holiday shopping. The union of these ideologies calls for a Buy Nothing Day to kick off a season of supporting local economy and family.

See also

Anti-consumerism
Advent Conspiracy
Car-Free Days
Circular Monday, a grassroots movement, database and shopping day for circular consumption
Culture jamming
Super Saturday (Panic Saturday)
Giving Tuesday
Singles' Day
Earth Overshoot Day
Festivus
Homo consumericus
Kashless.org
The Story of Stuff (2007 film)

References

External links
The Buy Nothing Day - thematic page (2019) by Adbusters Media Foundation
BND UK information and support for UK campaigners

Criticism of the commercialization of Christmas
Consumer boycotts
November observances
Friday observances
Observances based on the date of Thanksgiving (United States)
Recurring events established in 1992
Unofficial observances
Waste minimisation
1992 establishments in Canada
Retailing by time of year